Felipe José Kast Sommerhoff (born 9 June 1977) is a Chilean economist, researcher, consultant, and politician.

Early life and family
Kast is a nephew of far-right politician José Antonio Kast and son of the late economist Miguel Kast, who served as Minister of State and President of the Central Bank under the dictatorship of Augusto Pinochet. He is also the grandson of Michael Kast, a German officer who escaped American custody, obtained a false identity, and migrated to Chile in 1950, and great-great-great-grandson of German composers Robert Schumann and Clara Schumann.

Career
A graduate in economics from the Pontifical Catholic University of Chile with a PhD from Harvard University, Kast has been Minister of Planning, presidential candidate in the 2017 primary elections and deputy for the commune of Santiago between 2014 and 2018. He currently serves as senator for the Araucanía Region after being elected to a six-year term in the 2017 parliamentary elections.

As a right-wing independent, Kast actively participated in President Sebastián Piñera's first government, first as Minister of State and then as Presidential Delegate for emergency camps and villages occupied by 27 February 2010 Earthquake victims.

Kast is a founder and former president of Evópoli, a conservative-liberal and centre-right party. In what was described as a blow to Kast Gloria Hutt was elected president of the party in October 2022 rather than Kast's candidate Luciano Cruz-Coke.

Controversies 
On November 11, 2022, a video allegedly showing him in a car with a transsexual escort was leaked on Instagram, which caused great controversy.

References

External links
 Chilean National Congress Library Profile

1977 births
21st-century Chilean economists
Evópoli politicians
Pontifical Catholic University of Chile alumni
Harvard University alumni
Living people
Chilean people of German descent
Kast family
People from Santiago
Senators of the LV Legislative Period of the National Congress of Chile
Senators of the LVI Legislative Period of the National Congress of Chile